Stanton & Stockwell was a partnership of Jesse Earl Stanton and William Francis Stockwell, two architects active in Southern California during the mid-20th century. Works attributed to them include:
Los Angeles Mall, bounded by Main, Los Angeles, and Temple streets and US 101, Civic Center, Downtown Los Angeles (1974)
First Junípero Serra California State Office Building, 107 S. Broadway, Civic Center, Downtown Los Angeles (1958-1960)
California State Office Building Parking Garage, 145 S. Broadway, Civic Center, Downtown Los Angeles (1958-1960)
Belmont High School
Trojan Hall, University of Southern California
David X. Marks Tower (1963) and Hall (1954)

Attributed to the partnership of Stanton, Stockwell, Williams and Wilson: Jesse Earl Stanton, William Francis Stockwell, Paul Revere Williams, Adrian Jennings Wilson; formed to build the pair of Late Moderne civic buildings as part of the 1947 Civic Center Master Plan that ultimately transformed Bunker Hill, as the Civic Center expanded westward:
Stanley Mosk Courthouse, fourth building in history to house the Los Angeles County Superior Court, Civic Center, Downtown Los Angeles (1956-1958)
Kenneth Hahn Hall of Administration (orig. Los Angeles County Hall of Administration, 1960), Civic Center, Downtown Los Angeles (1960)

References

Architects from Los Angeles
Late Moderne architecture